Peter Kenny (born 23 May 1959) is a former Australian rules footballer who played with Carlton in the Victorian Football League (VFL). Originally from Manuka, he played for Swan Districts in the West Australian Football League before being recruited by Carlton. After leaving Carlton, Kenny played for Williamstown in the Victorian Football Association.

Notes

External links 

Peter Kenny's profile at Blueseum

1959 births
Carlton Football Club players
Australian rules footballers from the Australian Capital Territory
Living people
Swan Districts Football Club players
Williamstown Football Club players
Manuka Football Club players